The 2012–13 Cal Poly Mustangs men's basketball team represented California Polytechnic State University during the 2012–13 NCAA Division I men's basketball season. The Mustangs, led by fourth year head coach Joe Callero, played their home games at Mott Gym and were members of the Big West Conference. They finished the season 18–14, 12–6 in Big West play to finish in third place. They advanced to the semifinals of the Big West tournament where they lost to Pacific. They were invited to the 2013 CIT where they lost in the first round to Weber State.

Roster

Schedule

|-
!colspan=9| Regular season

|-
!colspan=9| 2013 Big West Conference men's basketball tournament

|-
!colspan=9| 2013 CIT

References

Cal Poly Mustangs men's basketball seasons
Cal Poly
Cal Poly
Cal Poly Mustangs men's basketball team
Cal Poly Mustangs men's basketball team